The Karnataka State Police Department is the law enforcement agency for the Indian state of Karnataka. The department is headed by the Director General and Inspector General of Police.
Total Police District=32
New Police District Vijayanagara Year of 2021

Organization
The District Police administration is headed by a Superintendent of Police. A group of districts comprise a Police Range, led by an Inspector General of Police. Big cities have Police Commissionerate led by Commissioner of Police. Bengaluru is headed by an officer with the rank of Additional Director General of Police (ADG). Mysuru is headed by an officer with the rank of Inspector General of Police (IGP). Belagavi, Hubballi-Dharwad, Kalaburagi and Mangaluru is headed by an officer with the rank of Deputy Inspector General of Police (DIG).

The Director General of Police (DGP) and Inspector General of Police (IGP) is the head of the State police department, and under him are Director General of Police and Additional Director General of Police. Each Additional Director General of Police is in charge of a particular function: law and order, crime and technical services, administration, intelligence, the Karnataka State Reserve Police, recruitment and training.

The police stations are the lowest units of the police department. There are 906 police stations, 230 circle offices, 91 SDPOs and 31 DPOs (including railway police) in Karnataka state. Police stations are headed by Inspector in towns and cities. There may be two to four Sub-Inspectors (S.I.) in addition to assistant sub-inspectors (A.S.I), Head Constables (H.C.) and police constables (P.C.). Rural police stations are headed by a sub-inspector or two sub-inspectors covering law and order and crime, depending on the station's importance and sensitivity. They are grouped into circles, comprising a sub-division. Sub-divisions are headed by Deputy Superintendents of Police and circles by Police Inspectors. Additional superintendent of police's (ASP's) are also there in some districts.

Hierarchy

Officers

(DGP & IG) Head of the state
 Additional Director General of Police (ADGP)
 Inspector General of Police (IGP)
 Deputy Inspector General of Police (DIG)
 Senior Superintendent of Police (SSP)
 Superintendent of Police (SP)
 Additional Superintendent of Police (ASP)
 Assistant SP (IPS) or Deputy SP (KSPS)

Sub-ordinates
 Inspector of Police (IP)
 Sub-Inspector of Police (SIP)
 Assistant Sub-Inspector of Police (ASIP)
 Head Constable
 Constable

Insignia of Karnataka Police (State Police)
Gazetted Officers

Non-gazetted officers

Law and Order
This wing is headed by an officer with the rank of Additional Director General of Police, Law and Order.

State Intelligence Department
The Intelligence Department is headed by an Additional Director General of Police, assisted by two Deputy Inspector General of Police and five Superintendents of Police at headquarters. The five Superintendents of Police in the Intelligence Divisions are in Bangalore, Mysore, Mangalore, Gulbarga and Belagavi,

Crime and Technical Services Wing
This wing is headed by the Additional Director General of Police, Crime and Technical Services. It includes the Fingerprint Bureau, Forensic Scientific Laboratory, Police Computer Wing and State Crime Record Bureau.

Reserve police
In the state, the police trace their origins to the former Mysore State Imperial Service. They consist of:
 A District Armed Reserve (DAR) for each district
 A City Armed Reserve (CAR) in Bangalore, Mysore, Mangalore, Belagavi and Hubli-Dharwad
 A Special Task Force (STF)
 The Karnataka Armed Reserve Mounted Police, headquartered in Mysore
 Coastal Security Police (CSP)
 Government Railway Police (GRP)

The Karnataka State Reserve Police (KSRP) is headed by an Additional Director General of Police, assisted by an Inspector General and one Deputy Inspectors General of Police at headquarters. The Karnataka State Reserve Police consists of 12 battalions: four in Bangaluru and one each in Mysuru, Belagavi, Kalaburagi, Mangaluru, Shivamogga, Shiggaon, Hassana and Tumakuru 2 IRB battalions are situated in Munirabad (Koppala) and Vijayapura. Indian Reserve Battalion (IRB) is a specially formed reserved force. They are well trained striking force.

Mounted police
In 1951 the horses in the maharaja's bodyguard were used for the Karnataka Armed Reserve Mounted Police, headquartered in Mysuru. The stables, fields and office buildings date to the maharajas' time. Mounted police are used for traffic duty, night patrol, officer training and the Mysuru Dasara. The force is made up of 90 horses and 150 officers and men.

Mounted-police riders still practice tent pegging, and are also known for games, ceremonial parades and showmanship. Its riders have won a number of prizes in national and international equestrian competitions. The mounted police is headed by S. G. Mariba Shetti, who has won gold medals at the 1995 World Police Games in Australia (1995) and in 2001 in Indianapolis (2001) and has commanded the Dasara procession since 1977.

Coastal Security Police
Karnataka state has coastline along Arabian sea. The Coastal Security Police, established in 1999, is headed by Superintendent of Police and other staff. Coastal security police stations have been setup along the coastline.

Forest Cell
The Forest Cell assists the Karnataka Forest Department with their operations.

Training
This wing is headed by the Director General of Police, Training, assisted by an Inspector General of Police (Training) and Deputy Inspector General of Police (Training). Karnataka has so many training institutions:
 Karnataka Police Academy, Mysuru
 Police Training College, Naganahalli, Kalaburagi
 Karnataka State Police Training School, Channapattana
 Karnataka Police Training school, Khanapura, Belagavi
 Armed Police Training School, Yalahanka, Bengaluru
 Police Training School, Aimangala, Chitradurga
 Police training School, Thanisandra, Bengaluru
Police Training School, Kaduru, Chilkkamagaluru
Police Training School, Dharawada
Police Training School, Jyothi Nagara, Mysuru
Temporary Police Training School, Navangar, Bagalkot

Police Training School, Munirabad, Koppala
Police Training School, Kangralli, Belagavi
Police Training School, Vijayapura
CCT Training Center, Kudlu, Bengaluru
CCT Training Center, Agara, Bengaluru
ANF Training Center, Karkala, Udupi
 Traffic Training Institute,RK Hegade Nagara, Bengaluru
 Special Branch Training Institute, Bengaluru
 Wireless Training Institute, Bengaluru
Police Driving And Maintenance School, Yelahanka, Bengaluru

Special units
State-level units perform specialized police functions and assist civil-police units:
Criminal Investigation Department (CID), Economic Offenses and Special Units: Headed by a Director General of Police, the unit oversees the Corps of Detectives, the Forest Cell, the Economic Offenses Unit and the Cyber Police Station.
Directorate of Civil-Rights Enforcement: Headed by an Additional Director General of Police, Civil Rights Enforcement, and assisted by an Inspector General of Police, a Deputy Inspector General of Police and a Superintendent of Police at headquarters. the wing has six field units (each headed by a Superintendent of Police) at the police ranges in Bengaluru, Mangaluru, Davanagere, Belagavi, Kalaburagi and Mysuru. The directorate monitors and investigates cases registered under the Protection of Civil Rights Act 1955 and the Prevention of Atrocities Act, and is the watchdog of rights and benefits extended to the Scheduled Castes and Scheduled Tribes.
Communication, Logistic and Modernization Wing: Headed by an Additional Director General of Police, the wing consists of a Police Wireless Unit and a Motor Transport Organisation (both headed by a Superintendent of Police).
Planning & Modernization: Headed by an Inspector General of police, Planning and Modernization, the wing receives consolidation proposals for the police department and submits them to the government for approval.
Police Housing & Welfare: Headed by an Inspector General of Police, Grievance Cell and Human Rights
Internal Security Division: Headed by an Additional Director General of Police, the unit oversees the Terrorism and Naxalist in Karnataka State, Cyber cell, Forensic cell, and Bomb Detection Squad specially designed force called "Garuda Force" and ANF (Anti Naxal Force) units in it.

See also
 Police IT
 Bengaluru City Police

Notes

References

State law enforcement agencies of India
 
Year of establishment missing
1885 establishments in British India
1965 establishments in Mysore State